The 2013 Clemson Tigers men's soccer team was the college's 53rd season of playing organized men's college soccer, and their 26th season playing in the Atlantic Coast Conference.  The Tigers were led by fourth-year head coach Mike Noonan, and played their home games at Riggs Field.

Roster

Accessed June 26, 2017

Draft picks
The Tigers had one player drafted in the 2014 MLS SuperDraft.

Schedule

|-
!colspan=6 style=""| Exhibition

|-
!colspan=6 style=""| Regular season

|-
!colspan=6 style=""| ACC Tournament

|-
!colspan=6 style=""| NCAA Tournament

See also 

 Clemson Tigers men's soccer
 2013 Atlantic Coast Conference men's soccer season
 2013 NCAA Division I men's soccer season
 2013 ACC Men's Soccer Tournament
 2013 NCAA Division I Men's Soccer Championship

References 

Clemson Tigers
Clemson Tigers men's soccer seasons
Clemson Tigers
Clemson Tigers